The  Banyaruguru are a closely related ethnic group (sometimes considered a subgroup) to the Batutsi, Banyankole, Bahima, Bahororo and Banyamulenge living in northern Rwanda and parts of Uganda.

See also
 Bunyaruguru

References

Ethnic groups in Rwanda
Ethnic groups in Uganda